Taiwan Professional Women's Softball League (TPWSL), is a women's softball league in Taiwan. The TPWSL is founded in 2016 by the Chinese Taipei Amateur Softball Association.

Teams

Timeline

Stadiums

Former stadiums

Champions

Awards

MVP

Best Pitcher

Wins leader

ERA leader

Batting average leader

Homerun leader

RBI leader

Stolen base leader

Strikeout leader

Coach of the year

Best ten

Gold glove/nice play award

Finals MVP

References 

Softball competitions
Professional sports leagues in Taiwan
2016 establishments in Taiwan
Sports leagues established in 2016
Women's sports leagues in Taiwan